Lumding College, established in 1959, is one of the oldest undergraduate, coeducational college situated in Lumding, Assam. This college is affiliated with the Gauhati University.

Departments

Science
Physics
Mathematics
Chemistry
Statistics
Computer Science
Geology
Botany
Zoology

Arts and Commerce
 Assamese
 Bengali
 English
History
Education
Economics
Political Science
Hindi
Management
Commerce

References

External links
http://www.lumdingcollege.org/index.php

Universities and colleges in Assam
Colleges affiliated to Gauhati University
Educational institutions established in 1959
1959 establishments in Assam
Lumding